Parker and Lee was founded in 1904 by Ivy Lee and George F. Parker in New York City. 

The firm rose quickly in the years immediately after its founding, gaining  lucrative clients like the Pennsylvania Railroad Company in 1906, which was at the time under public scrutiny for denying information and interviews to journalists.  Parker and Lee also worked for the Colorado Fuel & Iron Company during the controversial 1915 oilmen's strike, and later worked to end the American trade embargo on the Soviet Union.  The firm came under fire during WWII because it had done consulting work for German industrial giant IG Farben.

References

Public relations companies of the United States